Prince of Tears is a 2009 Taiwanese historical drama film by Yonfan. It was nominated for the Golden Lion at the 66th Venice International Film Festival. It tells the story of a family embroiled in the tragic "White Terror" suppression of political dissidents that was wrought during the 1950s by the Kuomintang government (KMT) after their acquisition of Taiwan in the 1940s.

The film was selected as the Hong Kong entry for the 82nd Academy Awards for Best Foreign Language Film in 2009.

Cast 
 Fan Zhiwei as Ding keqiang (丁克強)
 Océane Zhu as Jin Wanping (金皖平)
 Joseph Chang as Sun Hansheng (孫漢生)
 Terri Kwan as Ouyang Qianjun (歐陽千君)
 Kenneth Tsang as General Liu (劉將軍)
 Li Po-husan
 Tsai Pei-han
 Jack Kao
 Chiao Chiao
 Lin Yo-wei

Reception 
The film received generally negative reviews from the press.

Hong Kong film critic Perry Lam writes in Muse Magazine, "Prince of Tears makes a strange movie-going experience for, despite all the pathos - two little girls lose their father, a loyal soldier loses his life and a happy family is torn apart - the story is aesthetically shaped and distanced by the pictoral verve of the director to be eye-pleasing at all times."

See also
 List of Hong Kong submissions for the Academy Award for Best Foreign Language Film

References

External links 
 
 
 REDEFINE magazine - Prince of Tears Film Review

2009 films
2000s Mandarin-language films
Films set in the 1950s
Films set in Taiwan
Films directed by Yonfan
2009 drama films
Taiwanese drama films